Bapunagar is in Ahmedabad, Gujarat, India. It is in the eastern part of the city, in the Bpunagr ward. Its name derives from the word bapu, which refers to Gandhi, who was popularly called bapu, or 'father'.

History 
Bapunagar was established in the early 1960s, in the vicinity of the city of Ahmedabad, as a residential area for the poor mill workers, when Ahmedabad was a flourishing textile centre in India. Many of these mills had closed by the late 1980s, reducing the now unemployed mill workers to home businesses, such as making incense sticks or candles. The present day detergent giant Nirma started from Ambica Society in the compound of Navlakha Bungalow began as just one such home industry; the owner started by making household detergents and selling them door to door.

Navlakha Bungalow which is believed to be built around 1922 is now a heritage building (since 1966). In this bungalow, S.K.Varma and R.S.Varma established a trust under which they started a school to provide better education to children of Bapunagar. Students from more than 10 km away used to come to this school. The school, named "Shri Jivan Sadhana Higher Secondary School", is now 50 years old and going strong and is well known for giving best education low fees.

Industry and business 
In the early 1990s, diamond cutting arose as an industry in the absence of the textile mills. At present, Bapunagar ranks second in India as a diamond cutting centre, after only Surat. Diamond cutting has absorbed many of the workers who used to be employed by textile mills, and attracted additional people from the Saurashtra. This influx of new residents caused a resultant increase in the housing sector and construction is causing a second more recent employment boom. Bapunagar Darpan is local bi-weekly newspaper operated from Bapunagar, Ahmedabad.

Landmark 
Maleksaban, or Lal Bahadur Shastri Stadium, was the first sports stadium in Ahmedabad, but due to insufficient use and funding, it was converted into a sports complex, Sardar Patel Stadium. It is occasionally used for military drills and informal cricket games.

Built in the 1450s, Malik Saban Roza is now home to many. Encroachers have connected sandstone pillars with brick walls to demarcate their spaces, robbing the roza of its magnificent beauty.

Vijay Chowk is a square which divides the old and new portions of Bapunagar, and serves as a site for political gatherings and speeches, particularly when election campaigns are underway.

The city also serves as a source of agricultural products such as mangoes and chilis.

Diversity

Bapunagar has a diverse population, but is nicknamed "Mini-Saurashtra", as majority of its population have roots in the Amreli, Bhavnagar, Junagadh, Jamnagar and other districts of the Saurashtra region of Gujarat. This area is considered communally sensitive and has witnessed some of the worst post-independence violence, primarily struggles between the Hindu majority and the Muslim minority. The 1969 riots were the worst riots of that period, with about 1,100 lives lost, and the 2002 riots in 2001 took about 300 lives.

The VHP leader Pravin Togadia started his professional as well as political career from here.

This area has seen significant commercial growth in the wake of the revived diamond cutting and construction industries.

Bapunagar also has a sizeable population of out of state immigrants from Up, Rajasthan and From Maharashtra.

Many of the local retailers, franchises, restaurants and other businesses have observed the significant development that has taken place in the last decade. The general consensus being that to restore the branch in Bapunagar would be a benefit for all.

Bapunagar also now has some huge multi-specialty hospital units like "Sardar Hospital" and "Kakadia Hospital" and some decent sized health clubs/gymnasiums and a multi-sports ground. The state-of-the-art ESIC (Employees State Insurance Corporation) hospital is also situated on Stadium Road.

Just like rest of Ahmedabad, Bapunagar too has significant levels of atmospheric pollution, some very bad traffic problem and is in urgent need of attention from authorities.

This is also one of the fastest-developing areas of the city. Bapunagar is surrounded by areas like Odhav, Saraspur, Naroda, Gomtipur,

References 

Neighbourhoods in Ahmedabad
Cities and towns in Ahmedabad district